An oilseed press is a machine that lies at the center of vegetable oil extraction. This is due to the fact that this technology is designed to release oil from oilseeds. Multiple oilseed press layouts have been developed over time to complete this process, with each having its own distinct set of advantages and disadvantages. Moreover, the products that are created by oilseed presses, namely oil and oilseed meal, possess great nutritive benefits for humans and livestock respectively. The oilseed press, being at the center of the oil-extraction process, is joined with various other pieces of equipment and procedures that form a pre- and post-extraction system.

Oilseed press designs 
Breaking it down to its simplest formulation, the process that oilseed presses carry out appears is quite simple. Oilseed presses essentially extrude or ‘press’ vegetable oil from oil-bearing seeds, which include soybean, sunflower, peanut, safflower, canola, sesame, niger, castor bean, linseed, mustard, coconut, olive, and oil palm. The simplicity of this procedure is shadowed by the diversity of oilseed press designs that perform it. As seen in Table 1, oilseed press designs can be placed into the three major classes of traditional, manual, and mechanical presses. 
 
Traditional presses include ghanis, water extraction systems, and other methods. Aside from the ghani, these designs are generally low yielding and particularly labour intensive. Moreover, all the traditional forms mentioned operate on a batch system. This entails that only a given amount of oilseed can be processed at a given time and, when the oil has been extracted, the pressed oilseed must be cleaned out of the machine. Despite these setbacks, traditional oilseed presses are basic in their design and are composed of easily obtainable or easy-to-manufacture equipment.

As for manual presses, cage style and ram presses are the general layouts. While cage presses operate on a tedious batch system, the operation of ram presses is continuous. The latter point about the ram press design is joined by multiple other advantages that are listed in Table 1. These advantages are especially attractive for developing nations.

The final major class of oilseed presses, the powered press, is dominated by the expeller. These presses also exhibit continuous operation. Furthermore, they are available in a great range of sizes that can process anywhere from a few kilograms per hour to multiple tons per hour. These and other positive attributes (Table 1) are countered by how powered expellers require electricity or fossil fuels and how the components of expellers can wear quickly.

Table 1: Advantages and Drawbacks of Various Oilseed Press Designs

Note: *Pressure is a good indicator of pressing efficiency for oilseed presses.

Nutritional value of products 
No matter the design, the same end products are obtained from the operation of an oilseed press. After the oil is removed from the oilseed, an oilseed meal or cake remains. This valuable by-product is especially rich in protein. Aside from safflower and sunflower meal, most oilseed meals contain around 40% crude protein. Although this allows most oilseed meals to be readily applied as protein supplements for ruminants such as cattle, the truth is that many of these meals have undesirable amino acid ratios or exhibit poor digestibility which limits their use in swine and poultry diets.

An exception to this trend is soybean meal. It possesses an excellent amino acid profile, a low fibre content, high digestibility, and high crude protein levels ranging from 44 to 50%. These advantages, including soybean meal’s high lysine content of 6.5%, make it a very appropriate protein supplement in poultry and swine as well as ruminant diets. In fact, soybean meal accounts for 63% of the protein feed sources that are utilized globally. This surpasses the next-leading canola meal, which is also nutritionally adept for feeding to poultry and swine, by a full 51%.

In addition to the meal, the oil that is procured from oilseed presses possesses nutritive benefits.  Oils are naturally energy-dense materials that constitute about 25% of the total caloric intake of the typical individual. Particularly, vegetable oils are composed mainly of unsaturated fats (EUFIC, 2014; Indiana University 2014; Zambiazi et al., 2007), which include the essential omega-3 and -6 polyunsaturated fatty acids. Animal-based fats, in contrast, contain saturated fats, which are linked to cardiovascular disease.

Different oilseed species possess unique fatty acid profiles.  This same principle applies to the oil contents of various oilseeds as well. For example, while canola typically exhibits an oil content of around 40-45 %, soybeans consist of about 20% oil. Despite these specifics, it is important to note that the amount of oil extracted depends on the efficiency of the extraction process (Lardy, 2008). Decreased oil yield is detrimental in the perspective of oil production, yet is potentially beneficial for livestock producers since the leftover cake’s nutritive value is augmented.

Oil extraction process 
The actual extruding of vegetable oil from oilseeds by oilseed presses is preceded and followed by several other activities. The first step in the procedure is to have clean, dry seed. Removing material such as rocks, soil, chaff, leaves, sand, dust, and other foreign particles augments pressing efficiency, reduces wear, and decreases the chances of damage being done to the press. Drying seed to around 10% prevents the press from being clogged and also prevents the spread of mould during storage.

For seeds with hard seed coats such as sunflowers or groundnuts, dehusking or decortication is required. This removal of the seed coats improves productivity and reduces bulk. In addition to decortication, preliminary milling for some oilseeds such as groundnuts is needed. Before the oilseed can be pressed, scorching or heating of the seed may also have to be conducted. An example of this is how soybeans must be roasted to deactivate trypsin inhibitors that are anti-nutritional for swine and poultry. In general, warming seed before processing increases oil yield. Although the best seed temperature for pressing is 38-71 °C, it is known that warming sunflower seed in the sun for just a half hour raises oil yields by 25%.

All of this leads up to that actual pressing of the oilseed, which is followed by more procedures that involve processing the oil. Clarification removes small contaminants and impurities in the oil by letting the oil sit for a period, which allows the particles to settle. Further clarification can be done by heating the oil or filtering it through a fine cloth.  Clarification extends the shelf-life of the oil from days to months.
 
Degumming, bleaching, neutralization, and deodorizing are all processes that follow clarification. These procedures are often not applicable to developing nations due to their complexity and the fact that the flavours of unrefined oils are well accepted in these areas. Whether these processes are applied or not, the oil must be stored in some way. Storage containers should be filled with oil to the top, completely clean, air and water tight, and opaque in colour. Moreover, oil should be stored in a cool area away from light.

References

Agricultural machinery
Vegetable oils